Outspoken may refer to:

 Outspoken (album), 2012 album by metalcore band For All Those Sleeping
 OutSpoken, screen reader software
 Outspoken Award, given by the International Gay and Lesbian Human Rights Commission
 Parrhesia, the obligation to speak candidly in rhetoric